Raulumi is a surname. Notable people with the surname include:

Jacob Rauluni (born 1972), Fijian rugby union player
Mosese Rauluni (born 1975), Fijian rugby union player, brother of Jacob
Unaisi Rauluni (born 1994), Fijian netball player

Fijian-language surnames